Lavin is a surname. Notable people with the surname include:

Andrew Lavin, Irish politician
Christine Lavin (born 1952), American folk singer
Deborah Lavin (born 1939), British academic
Frank Lavin, American politician
Gerard Lavin (born 1974), British football player
Joaquín Lavín (born 1953), Chilean politician
Johnny Lavin, American baseball player
Kristy Lavin, basketball player
Leonard H. Lavin (born 1919), American businessman and philanthropist
Linda Lavin (born 1937), American actress
Mary Lavin (1912–1996), Irish-American novelist
Matthew "Matt" Lavin (born ?), botanist
Mónica Lavín (born 1955), Mexican writer
Rodolfo Lavín (born 1977), Mexican race car driver
Sheldon Lavin (born 1932), American billionaire - owner, CEO and chairman of OSI Group
Steve Lavin (born 1964), American basketball coach and analyst
Sylvia Lavin, American architecture scholar
T. J. Lavin (born 1976), American BMX rider
Tom Lavin, Canadian musician and producer

Fictional characters:
Lucius Lavin, Stargate character